The Ridgway Historic District is a residential preservation district in Santa Rosa, California. Its boundaries are Ridgway Avenue to the north, U.S. Route 101 to the west, College Avenue to the south, and Mendocino Avenue to the east.

Santa Rosa High School and Santa Rosa Junior College are nearby, north of the district. The Cherry Street Historic District lies southeast of the Ridgway district, and the St. Rose Historic District is south.

There is an alternative/continuation high school, Ridgway High, on the street.

The Ridgway Historic Neighborhood Association  (RHNA) has been active since around 1990.

References

External links
 Ridgway Historic Neighborhood Association
 Comstock House 

Neighborhoods in Santa Rosa, California